Robin William Baker CMG FRSA (born 4 October 1953) is a British academic and former Vice-Chancellor of Canterbury Christ Church University. His research interests are Hungarian, Romanian and late Byzantine history, ethnic minorities in South-East Europe and heretical movements in the Middle Ages.

Robin Baker was educated at Bishop Wordsworth's School, and went on to graduate with a BA degree from the School of Slavonic and East European Studies (now part of University College London), and completed his PhD at the University of East Anglia in 1984 entitled "Innovation and variation in the case system of contemporary Komi dialects". He also spent time studying at the Stanford Graduate School of Business and is a Fellow of University College London.

He was the Deputy Director-General of the British Council (2002–2005) where he was responsible for the council's global operations, before becoming Pro Vice-Chancellor of the University of Kent (2005–2007). He was appointed a Companion of St Michael and St George (CMG) in 2005. He was appointed Vice-Chancellor of the University of Chichester in 2007 and became Vice-Chancellor of Canterbury Christ Church University in September 2010. He resigned in October 2012.

References

1953 births
Living people
People educated at Bishop Wordsworth's School
Alumni of the UCL School of Slavonic and East European Studies
Alumni of the University of East Anglia
People associated with the University of Chichester
People associated with the University of Kent
People associated with Canterbury Christ Church University
Companions of the Order of St Michael and St George
British historians